Khangebam Thoi Singh (born 5 October 1990) is an Indian professional footballer who plays as a midfielder for Real Kashmir in the I-League.

Youth career
Thoi started his career when representing his state Manipur in the Mir Iqbal Hussain Trophy, a National level under-16 sub-junior trophy. Thoi signed his first professional contract with Chennai-based Indian Bank in 2006 to represent them in the I-League 2nd Division.

Senior career
His performances with the southern side attracted the interest of Maharashtra-based (now defunct) Mahindra United, where he signed a 3-year contract in 2007. The highlight of his time at Mahindra includes a tournament winning goal in the final of the 2008 Durand Cup against Churchill Brothers. Thoi joined Goan-based Salgaocar in 2010 for the 2010-11 season where he won the league with Salgaocar, though only appearing 8 times and scoring once, and was predominantly used as a squad player. He accepted Bhaichung Bhutia's inviatiton to play for I-League 2nd Division team United Sikkim, where he stayed for two seasons, appearing regularly in the 2011 season and 2012 season alongside Bhutia, Renedy Singh and Sandesh Jhingan.

While United Sikkim gained promotion, Thoi's services was enlisted by newly formed Mumbai Tigers, then known as Dodsal FC for the 2013 I-League 2nd Division. Thoi became the first player to score for the Mumbai-based team when he scored against Army Red in their first professional game on 25 August 2012 at the Ambedkar Stadium in Delhi in the 2012 Durand Cup. Thoi scored twice in the tournament as Mumbai Tigers reached the final, but were beaten 3-2 on penalties by Air India.

Thoi would then be picked up by another newly formed Bangalore based team Bengaluru FC for the 2013-14 I-League. He made 21 appearances in the I-League for Bengaluru FC in the central midfield and scored thrice and helped his side win the league in their first professional season in Indian football. He would continue with Bengaluru for another season by winning the 2014-15 Federation Cup before making 16 appearances and scoring 5 times in the 2014-15 I-League as his team finished runner-up behind Mohun Bagan.

Thoi along with Robin Singh and Sunil Chhetri were contracted to the Indian Super League and will be loaned back to Bengaluru FC for the 2016 I-League season. He was picked up by Chennai-based Chennaiyin for the 2015 Indian Super League for INR 8.6 million during the 2015 ISL Auctions, making him the 3rd most expensive Indian player in the ISL only below his teammates at Bengaluru FC, Sunil Chhetri and Eugeneson Lyngdoh. He recently signed for Mumbai FC for the 2017 I-League Season.

International career
Thoi Singh was called up to the India U19 team for the 2006 AFC Youth Championship held in India between 29 October – 12 November 2006. He made his only appearance as a substitute against Jordan U19s playing as a forward.

Honours

Club
Mahindra United
 Durand Cup: 2008
Salgaocar
 I-League: 2010-11
United Sikkim
 I-League 2nd Division: 2012
Bengaluru FC
 I-League: 2013-14
 Federation Cup: 2014-15
Chennaiyin FC
 Indian Super League: 2015
 Indian Super League: 2017–18
Real Kashmir
 IFA Shield: 2021

References

External links 
 
 

1990 births
Living people
People from Thoubal district
Indian footballers
India youth international footballers
Mahindra United FC players
Salgaocar FC players
United Sikkim F.C. players
Mumbai Tigers FC players
Bengaluru FC players
Association football midfielders
Footballers from Manipur
I-League players
I-League 2nd Division players
Chennaiyin FC players
Mumbai FC players
Indian Super League players
Real Kashmir FC players